Rich Tradition (foaled March 13, 1956 in Virginia) was an American Thoroughbred racemare bred by Taylor Hardin's Newstead Farm and raced by Christopher Chenery.

A daughter of Rosemont, Rich Tradition was out of the Challenger mare, Legendra. Trained by Casey Hayes, Rich Tradition was a major competitor in the two-year-old filly ranks in 1958, winning the important Schuylerville, Spinaway and Selima

References

1956 racehorse births
Thoroughbred family 4-r
Racehorses bred in Virginia
Racehorses trained in the United States